William King Sebastian (June 12, 1812May 20, 1865) was an American politician, judge, and lawyer from Helena, Arkansas. He represented Arkansas as a U.S. Senator, Democrat, from 1848 to 1861. Sebastian withdrew from the Senate at the start of the Civil War and was later formally expelled by the Senate. He took no active part in the Confederate government and was reinstated by a posthumous resolution in 1877.

Early life
Sebastian was born in Centerville, Tennessee on June 12, 1812; sometime around 1834 he graduated from Columbia College, also in Tennessee, and began studying law. He moved to Arkansas in 1835, where he was admitted to the bar and began practice in Helena, Arkansas; later he became a cotton planter. From 1835 to 1837 he was a prosecuting attorney; he served as a circuit court judge from 1840 to 1843, in which year he was made an associate justice of the Arkansas Supreme Court. In 1846 he became a member of the Arkansas Senate, serving as its president until 1847. Also in 1846 he served as a presidential elector on the Democratic ticket.

Political career
In 1848, upon the death of Chester Ashley, he was appointed to the United States Senate, subsequently being elected in his own right. He was reelected in 1853 and 1859. During his time in the Senate, he served as the chair of the Committee on Manufactures, as well as on the Committee on Indian Affairs. He supported Superintendent of Indian Affairs for California and Nevada Edward Fitzgerald Beale's plans to form a series of Indian reservations in California, garrisoned by a military post, on government owned land. The Indians were to support themselves by farming. The first of these reservations, the Sebastian Indian Reservation was named for him.

Later life
When the American Civil War began, "he did not resign, as did all the other southern senators save Andrew Johnson, but remained a melancholy and helpless spectator of events". In July 1861 he was expelled for his suspected support of the Confederacy. Upon his ejection from the Senate, Sebastian returned to Helena, where he lived for the duration of the Civil War and practiced law. After federal troops occupied Helena, he moved to Memphis, Tennessee, in 1864 and resumed the practice of law; he died there on May 20, 1865, and is buried in a private family cemetery in Phillips County. Sebastian County, Arkansas is named for him. In 1877, the Senate revoked the resolution of expulsion which they had passed upon Sebastian, and consequently paid the compensation due to his children.

See also
 List of slave owners
 List of United States senators expelled or censured

References

Further reading

External links
 

|-

1812 births
1865 deaths
19th-century American judges
19th-century American lawyers
19th-century American politicians
American planters
American slave owners
Arkansas lawyers
Arkansas state court judges
Democratic Party Arkansas state senators
Justices of the Arkansas Supreme Court
Burials in Arkansas
Democratic Party United States senators from Arkansas
Expelled United States senators
People of Arkansas in the American Civil War
People from Centerville, Tennessee
People from Helena, Arkansas
People of Tennessee in the American Civil War
United States senators who owned slaves